This is a list of rugby league footballers who played first-grade for the North Sydney Bears in Australia's top-level domestic men's rugby-league club competition.

First-grade players (1908-1999)

References

 
Lists of Australian rugby league players
National Rugby League lists
Sydney-sport-related lists